Alexander Gill the Elder (7 February 1565 – 17 November 1635), also spelled Gil, was an English scholar, spelling reformer, and high-master of St Paul's School, where his pupils included John Milton. He was the author of an English grammar, which was written, however, in Latin.

Life
He was born in Lincolnshire 7 February 1565, admitted as a scholar of Corpus Christi College, Oxford, in September 1583, and earned a B.A. in 1586 and an M.A. in 1589. Wood believed that he was a schoolmaster in Norwich, where he was living in 1597. On 10 March 1607-8 he was appointed high-master of St. Paul's School, succeeding Richard Mulcaster. Milton was among his pupils from 1620 to 1625.

He had two sons, George and Alexander (b. 1597), and a daughter, Annah. George Gill would eventually become ordained.

In 1628, his son Alexander was overheard drinking to the health of John Felton, who had stabbed George Villiers, 1st Duke of Buckingham. Buckingham was a favorite of King Charles I, but hated by the public. Felton was widely acclaimed as a hero for assassinating him. Gill the Younger was sentenced to have both ears removed and was fined £2000. However, his father intervened directly with William Laud. This effort managed a remission of the punishment inflicted by the Star Chamber. Alexander Gill the Younger would later become a noted scholar in his own right.

Gill the Elder died at his house in St. Paul's Churchyard 17 November 1635, and was buried 20 November in Mercers' Chapel. He was survived by his wife, Elizabeth.

Works

Grammar
Logonomia Anglica, qua gentis sermo facilius addiscitur, London, by John Beale, 1619, 2nd edit. 1621, was his English grammar dedicated to James I. Gill's book, written in Latin, opens with suggestions for a phonetic system of English spelling (see below). In his section on grammatical and rhetorical figures Gill quotes freely from Edmund Spenser, George Wither, Samuel Daniel, and other English poets. It was more comprehensive than earlier works, and devoted attention to syntax and prosody. An edition was produced in 1903 by Otto Luitpold Jiriczek; a facsimile of the 1619 edition was published in 1972.

Phonetic change suggestions
Among the suggested changes to make English more phonetic were the following :
 Revive the Anglo-Saxon signs ð (eð) and þ (þorn) for the two sounds of th
 Use of the letter ŋ (eŋ)

Theological works
Gilpublished two theological works:
A Treatise concerning the Trinitie of Persons in Unitie of the Deitie  (written at Norwich in 1597), London, 1601; reprinted 1635. This was an addressed to Thomas Mannering, described as an Anabaptist.
Sacred Philosophie of the Holy Scripture, London, 1635, a commentary on the Apostles' Creed.
A further work, referred to in Gil's Sacred Philosophie as "[t]he second part of Logonomia which I call Logicke", is lost.  According to Gil, it "was especially meant to be an helpe to them that needed helpe for the understanding of [Sacred Philosophie]".  The work which, despite its name, was distinct from Logonomia Anglica, probably dates from the period between the second edition of Logonomia Anglica (1621) and the Sacred Philosophie.

Notes

External links
 
 

1563 births
1635 deaths
English orthography
Linguists of English
High Masters of St Paul's School
Orthographers
People from Lincolnshire
17th-century English educators
16th-century English educators